St Hugh's Charterhouse, Parkminster, is the only post-Reformation Carthusian monastery in the United Kingdom. It is located in the parish of Cowfold, West Sussex, England. It is a Grade II* listed building.

History
The monastery was founded in 1873, when the property formerly known as Picknoll was acquired for its construction in order to accommodate two houses of French Carthusians in exile. Building took place between 1876 and 1883 to designs by a French architect, Clovis Normand, who had at his disposal a generous budget. The number of monks has varied: 22 in 1883, 43 in 1932, 22 in 1984, and there were 27 monks as of January 2021.

The buildings are in a French Gothic Revival style although Pevsner's judgement was that 'the plan is magnificent and can only be properly seen from the air'. The church has relics of Saint Hugh of Lincoln, Saint Boniface and the Virgin Mary; and an unusually tall  spire. It stands in the centre of buildings including a library with a collection of rare books and manuscripts and a chapter house decorated with images of the martyrdom of the monks' predecessors.

The total length of the cloisters is 1,012 m.

See also
 List of Carthusian monasteries
 List of monasteries dissolved by Henry VIII of England
 List of monastic houses in England
 List of places of worship in Horsham District

References

Further reading
Robin Bruce Lockhart, Half-way to Heaven: The Hidden Life of the Sublime Carthusians (London: Thames Methuen, 1985)
Nancy Klein Maguire, An Infinity of Little Hours: Five Young Men and Their Trial of Faith in the Western World's Most Austere Monastic Order (roman à clef, = novel based on real-life stories) (New York: PublicAffairs Books 2006, a division of Perseus Publishing, ISBN hardback , paperback 978-1-58648-432-3)

External sources

Carthusian monasteries in England
Monasteries in West Sussex
1873 establishments in England
19th-century Christian monasteries
Grade II* listed buildings in West Sussex
Roman Catholic churches completed in 1886
Grade II* listed Roman Catholic churches in England
Grade II* listed monasteries
19th-century Roman Catholic church buildings in the United Kingdom